"Lonesome Loser" is a song written by David Briggs and performed by Australian rock music group Little River Band. Released in July 1979 as the lead single from their fifth studio album First Under the Wire, the song peaked at number 19 on the Australian Kent Music Report singles chart. The song also peaked at No. 6 on the Billboard Hot 100, becoming the band's third top 10 hit and sixth overall top 40 hit in the United States.

Track listing
 Australian 7" (Capitol Records – CP-11972)
A. "Lonesome Loser" - 3:30
B. "Another Runway" - 6:28

US 7" single (Capitol Records – 4748)
A. "Lonesome Loser" - 3:59
B. "Shut Down Turn Off" - 3:50

Chart performance

Weekly charts

Year-end charts

References

Little River Band songs
1979 singles
Song recordings produced by John Boylan (record producer)
1979 songs
Capitol Records singles